Sean Patrick McClare (born 12 January 1978) is an English former footballer. He played for Barnsley between 1993 and 2001, before moving on to Port Vale following a short loan spell. In summer 2003 he moved on to Rochdale, before being released the following year. He later turned out for non-league sides Halifax Town, Bradford Park Avenue, Scarborough, and Grantham Town.

Career
McClare began his career with Barnsley, making 69 first team appearances in all competitions between 1993 and 2001. He found most of his first team action under John Hendrie's stewardship in the 1998–99 First Division campaign, playing 40 games and scoring four goals. He played nine games for Rochdale during a loan spell in April 2000, before he joined Port Vale on loan in November 2001. After his loan spell with Vale finished he was signed by Brian Horton permanently on a free transfer, scoring his first goal for the club against Oldham Athletic. He made 25 appearances for the "Valiants" in 2001–02, before playing 20 games in 2002–03. He left Vale Park after he was released in May 2003.

In July 2003 he signed with Rochdale on a permanent basis. He played 41 games for the "Dale", however he was released in May 2004 after what was a poor season for the club, as they finished two places above the Third Division relegation zone. In February 2005 he moved on to Halifax Town, but the next month he signed with Bradford Park Avenue, where he saw out the rest of the season.

In November 2005, McClare signed for former Oakwell teammate Neil Redfearn's Scarborough, making around 15 appearances, but the "Seadogs" were relegated from the Conference at the end of the 2005–06 season and he was released alongside most of the squad.

McClare returned to the part-time game in autumn 2006, signing for Unibond Premier Division side Grantham Town. After only twenty five appearances, and despite being one of the "Gingerbreads" most experienced and impressive players, financial constraints resulted in him being released by Town in January 2007.

Career statistics
Source:

References

1978 births
Living people
Footballers from Rotherham
English footballers
Association football midfielders
Barnsley F.C. players
Rochdale A.F.C. players
Port Vale F.C. players
Halifax Town A.F.C. players
Bradford (Park Avenue) A.F.C. players
Scarborough F.C. players
Grantham Town F.C. players
English Football League players
National League (English football) players